"Punk&Baby's" is the 11th single released by Nana Kitade. The song was inspired by the British 1980s Punk rock era. It was used as the outro theme to the TV program "Rank Okoku" for June and July 2008. This single featured her third rework of "Kesenai Tsumi", the others being "Kesenai Tsumi 'Raw Breath Track' from her "Kesenai Tsumi" Single and "Kesenai Tsumi: I scream Tenpura Version, from Her "Berry Berry Singles" album. This is also the second single where DVDs are distributed. The limited edition includes a bonus DVD with the music video for "Punk&Baby's", an air guitar lesson, and making-of footage.

Video information
The video for "Punk&Baby's" shows Nana Kitade and her band performing in a club.

Track listings
CD
Punk&Baby's
Lamia
Kesenai Tsumi/Punk&Baby's: Air Guitar Mix
Punk&Baby's:Instrumental

DVD
Punk&Baby's (A Making Document of Video Clip)
Punk&Baby's (Video Clip)
Punk&Baby's (Air Guitar Lesson!)

Charts

2008 singles
Nana Kitade songs
Songs written by Nana Kitade
2008 songs
Sony Music Entertainment Japan singles